Omorgus nanningensis is a species of hide beetle in the subfamily Omorginae.

References

nanningensis
Beetles described in 2005